The 2021–22 season was the 63rd season in the existence of Pau FC and the club's second consecutive season in the second division of French football. In addition to the domestic league, Pau participated in this season's edition of the Coupe de France.

Players

First-team squad

Transfers

Pre-season and friendlies

Competitions

Overall record

Ligue 2

League table

Results summary

Results by round

Matches
The league fixtures were announced on 25 June 2021.

Coupe de France

References

Pau FC seasons
Pau